Rossano is a male Italian given name. Notable people with the name include:

 Rossano Brasi (born 1972), Italian cyclist
 Rossano Brazzi (1916–1994), Italian actor
 Rossano Ercolini, Italian teacher and grassroots environmentalist
 Rossano Galtarossa (born 1972), Italian competition rower and Olympic champion
 Rossano Rubicondi (1972–2021), Italian actor and model, fourth husband of Ivana Trump

See also
 Rossana (given name)
 Rossano (disambiguation)

Italian given names
Italian masculine given names